"Fred Astaire" is a song recorded by Australian indie pop band San Cisco, from the band's debut self-titled studio album. Originally released as a CD-R promotional single in November 2012, "Fred Astaire" was released as the album's second Australian single (third overall) in January 2013. The song debuted and peaked at number 89 in Australia in February 2013.

The song polled at number 48 in the Triple J Hottest 100, 2012.

The song was released in North America in May 2013.

At the ARIA Music Awards of 2013, the Andrew Nowrojee directed video was nominated for ARIA Award for Best Video.

Reception
Jason Grishkoff from Indie Shuffle said the song a "thoroughly fun indie pop single." Daniel Martin from NME called the song "Super-sickly indie pop".

Track listings
Digital single
 "Fred Astaire" - 2:56

7" single
 "Fred Astaire"
 "John's Song"

Charts

References

2012 songs
2013 singles
San Cisco songs
Songs written by Scarlett Stevens